Preetika Rao is an Indian actress, model and film-columnist who primarily works in Hindi television and advertisement films. She made her acting debut with the Tamil film Chikku Bukku (2010). Rao is best known for portraying Aaliya Zain Abdullah in her television debut Beintehaa (2013–14) for which she won several awards including Gold Awards for Best Debut-Female and ITA Awards for GR8! Onscreen Couple with Harshad Arora.

Early life
Rao was born in Mangalore, Karnataka. She comes from a Konkani-speaking Hindu family. She graduated majoring in history from Sophia College, while also acquiring a diploma in Advertising and Journalism. She wrote for Bangalore Mirror, Deccan Chronicle and the Asian Age. Her sister, Amrita Rao is a Bollywood actress.

After her acting debut, she moved to the United States for her diploma course in Broadcast Journalism from the New York Film Academy, New York.

Career

(2010–2014)
She made her acting and film debut with the Tamil film Chikku Bukku (2010) where she played the lead as Meenal "Ammu" alongside Arya. She then made her Telugu debut with the role of Madhu Latha in Priyudu (2012) opposite Varun Sandesh.

Rao made the transition from regional cinema in 2013 and made her television debut with Beintehaa opposite Harshad Arora. She portrayed Aaliya Ghulam Haider/Aaliya Zain Abdullah and received various awards for her performance including Gold Awards Best Debut- Female.

(2015–2018)
In 2015, Rao made her singing debut with the single "Na Tum Humein Jano". The same year she made her Kannada debut with the role of Preetika in Rebel alongside Aditya. In 2016, she appeared as a Contestant in Box Cricket League.
 
Rao made her comeback to television with Love Ka Hai Intezaar in 2017. She portrayed Mohini Mathur Ranawat/Mohini Ayaan Mehta opposite Mohit Sehgal. She then appeared as Priya alongside Yunus Khan in the short film Metro Mulaqat. The same year she released her second single "Yaad Kiya Dil Ne" with Siddharth Basrur.

In 2018, She played Mahima "Mahi" Malhotra in Laal Ishq alongside Priyank Sharma and Niti Taylor in the episode "Gudiya". She has also appeared in the music videos 'Surilee' with Shaan (2017) 'Tere Vede' (2018) and 'Tenu Bhul Na Pavagi' (2018).

(2019–present)
Rao will next be seen in an Kannada film directed by Shreyas Sudhindra, which also stars Achyuth Kumar, Balaji Manohar and Naveen Suvarnahalli.

Preetika Rao launched her Youtube channel in June 2022 which is running successfully and has marked her career as a content creator and producer on YouTube.

Media Credits

As a teen-model, Rao appeared in an advertisement for Cadbury Dairy Milk, along with Amitabh Bachchan, directed by Shoojit Sircar, and has over 200 TVC and print campaigns to her credit.

Rao was felicitated in Dar Es Salaam at the Sinema Zetu International Festival for her immense popularity in Tanzania due to her show Beintehaa. In 2014, she ranked 6th in Rediffs Top 10 Television Actresses List.

Filmography

Films

Television

Special appearances

Music videos

Discography

Awards and nominations

References

External links
 
 Preetika Rao on YouTube

Indian film actresses
Actresses in Hindi cinema
Actresses in Tamil cinema
Living people
Sophia College for Women alumni
Actresses in Hindi television
Indian television actresses
21st-century Indian actresses
Actresses from Mumbai
Actresses in Telugu cinema
Actresses in Kannada cinema
Female models from Mumbai
Year of birth missing (living people)